The Mathematical Gazette is an academic journal of mathematics education, published three times yearly, that publishes "articles about the teaching and learning of mathematics with a focus on the 15–20 age range and expositions of attractive areas of mathematics."

It was established in 1894 by Edward Mann Langley as the successor to the Reports of the Association for the Improvement of Geometrical Teaching.  Its publisher is the Mathematical Association. William John Greenstreet was its editor for more than thirty years (1897–1930). Since 2000, the editor is Gerry Leversha.

Editors 

 Edward Mann Langley: 1894–1896
 Francis Sowerby Macaulay: 1896–1897
 William John Greenstreet: 1897–1930
 Alan Broadbent: 1930–1955
 Reuben Goodstein: 1956–1962
 Edwin A. Maxwell: 1962–1971
 Douglas Quadling: 1971–1980
 Victor Bryant: 1980–1990
 Nick MacKinnon: 1990–1994
 Steve Abbott: 1994–2000
 Gerry Leversha: 2000–

References

External links 
 Official website

Mathematics education journals
Mathematics education in the United Kingdom
1894 establishments in England
Academic journals published by learned and professional societies of the United Kingdom
Publications established in 1894
English-language journals